= Plahi =

- Village
- Country: India
- State: Punjab
- District: Kapurthala
- Tehsil: Phagwara

Government
  - Type: Panchayat raj
  - Body: Gram panchayat

Area
  - Total: 355.73 ha (879.0 acres)

Population (2011)
  - Total: 2,745; 1,457/1,288 ♂/♀
  - Scheduled Castes: 1,176; 588/588 ♂/♀
  - Total Households: 564

Languages
  - Official: Punjabi
- Time zone: UTC+5:30 (IST)
- ISO 3166 code: IN-PB
- Website: kapurthala.gov.in

Plahi is a village in Phagwara in Kapurthala district of Punjab State, India. It is located 4 kilometres (2.5 mi) from sub district headquarter and 40 kilometres (25 mi) from district headquarter. The village is administrated by Sarpanch an elected representative of the village.

== Demography ==
As of 2011, The village has a total number of 564 houses and the population of 2745 of which 1457 are males while 1288 are females. According to the report published by Census India in 2011, out of the total population of the village 1176 people are from Schedule Caste and the village does not have any Schedule Tribe population so far.

== See also ==
- List of villages in India
